"Not a Damn Thing Changed" is a song by Danish pop and soul band Lukas Graham. It was released on 12 October 2018 as the second single from their third studio album, 3 (The Purple Album). The song was written by Lukas Forchhammer, Stefan Forrest, Morten Ristorp, David LaBrel, Henrik Bryld Wolsing and Rasmus Hedegaard. The song peaked at number two on the Danish Singles Chart.

Background
Talking about the song, Forchhammer said, "I still live two blocks away from where I grew up. I still hang out with the same guys. The song is a tribute to one of the guys I grew up with who hung himself in January. He was three months older than me and we walked through life together."

Music video
A music video to accompany the release of "Not a Damn Thing Changed" was first released on YouTube on 11 October 2018 at a total length of three minutes and forty-nine seconds. The video was directed by René Sascha Johannsen. Forchhammer's real-life childhood friends appear in the video, which they filmed in Copenhagen and their hometown, Christiania.

Track listing

Charts

Release history

References

2018 singles
2018 songs
Lukas Graham songs
Songs written by Stefan Forrest
Songs written by Morten Ristorp
Songs written by Lukas Forchhammer
Songs written by Hedegaard (DJ)
Copenhagen Records singles